Kukaracha is a Georgian film released in 1982. It is based on the story of Nodar Dumbadze. Directors of the  film are: Siko Dolidze and Keti Dolidze.

Plot
Kukaracha is trustee of police in the one of the districts of Tbilisi. People loved him, because he wasn't only a policeman for them, he was a defender of kindness and morals. He was killed because of his principles.

Starring
Levan Uchaneishvili (Kukaracha)
Nineli Chankvetadze (Inga)
Zaza Kolelishvili (Murtalo)
Mari Janashia (Aniko)
Lado Tatishvili
Givi Tokhadze
Dudukhana Tserodze
Lia Kapanadze
Tamaz Toloraia
Bondo Goginava
Grigol Tsitaishvili
Ketevan Esaiashvili
Omar Gabelia
Iamze Tkavadze
Jimi Devnozashvili
Dato Kublashvili
Mikheil Kozakov
D. Nafetvaridze
D. Tsetskhladze
L. Lomsadze
Ketevan Murvanidze
Akaki Berdzenishvili
B. Berdzenishvili
Anzor Urdia
Nodar Sulemanashvili
L. Sulemanashvili
Platon Koiava

References
 Film on web-page of National Filmography of Georgia

Comedy-drama films from Georgia (country)
1982 films
1980s biographical films
1980s historical films